Taste receptor type 1 member 3 is a protein that in humans is encoded by the TAS1R3 gene. The TAS1R3 gene encodes the human homolog of mouse Sac taste receptor, a major determinant of differences between sweet-sensitive and -insensitive mouse strains in their responsiveness to sucrose, saccharin, and other sweeteners.

Structure 
The protein encoded by the TAS1R3 gene is a G protein-coupled receptor with seven trans-membrane domains and is a component of the heterodimeric amino acid taste receptor TAS1R1+3 and sweet taste receptor TAS1R2+3. This receptor is formed as a protein dimer with either TAS1R1 or TAS1R2.
Experiments have also shown that a homo-dimer of TAS1R3 is also sensitive to natural sugar substances.  This has been hypothesized as the mechanism by which sugar substitutes do not have the same taste qualities as natural sugars.

Ligands 

The G protein-coupled receptors for sweet and umami taste are formed by dimers of the TAS1R proteins. 
The TAS1R1+3 taste receptor is sensitive to the glutamate in monosodium glutamate (MSG) as well as the synergistic taste-enhancer molecules inosine monophosphate (IMP) and guanosine monophosphate (GMP).  These taste-enhancer molecules are unable to activate the receptor alone, but are rather used to enhance receptor responses many to L-amino acids. The TAS1R2+3 receptor has been shown to respond to natural sugars sucrose and fructose, and artificial sweeteners saccharin, acesulfame potassium, dulcin, guanidinoacetic acid.

Signal transduction 

TAS1R2 and TAS1R1 receptors have been shown to bind to G proteins, most often the gustducin Gα subunit, although a gustducin knock-out has shown small residual activity. TAS1R2 and TAS1R1 have also been shown to activate Gαo and Gαi protein subunits. This suggests that TAS1R1 and TAS1R2 are G protein-coupled receptors that inhibit adenylyl cyclases to decrease cyclic guanosine monophosphate (cGMP) levels in taste receptors. The TAS1R3 protein, however, has been shown in vitro to couple with Gα subunits at a much lower rate than the other TAS1R proteins.  While the protein structures of the TAS1R proteins are similar, this experiment shows that the G protein-coupling properties of TAS1R3 may be less important in the transduction of taste signals than the TAS1R1 and TAS1R2 proteins.

Location and innervation 

TAS1R1+3 expressing cells are found in fungiform papillae at the tip and edges of the tongue and palate taste receptor cells in the roof of the mouth.  These cells are shown to synapse upon the chorda tympani nerves to send their signals to the brain. TAS1R2+3 expressing cells are found in circumvallate papillae and foliate papillae near the back of the tongue and palate taste receptor cells in the roof of the mouth.  These cells are shown to synapse upon the glossopharyngeal nerves to send their signals to the brain. TAS1R and TAS2R (bitter) channels are not expressed together in any taste buds.

References

Further reading

External links 
 TAS1R3 Gene
 TASTE RECEPTOR TYPE 1, MEMBER 3; TAS1R3

Human taste receptors